The Australian Street Stock Championship is a Dirt track racing championship held each year to determine the Australian national champion. The championship is held over a single meeting (usually on consecutive nights) and has run annually since the 1989/90 season and is awarded to a different state of Australia each year by the national controlling body, the Australian Saloon Car Federation (ASCF).

As of 2013/14, the championship has not been held in either New South Wales or Queensland. The championship is generally run at country tracks and only twice (1992 and 2012) has it been held in a state capital city, that being the Northline Speedway in Darwin.

The first championship was run at the Permier Speedway in Warrnambool, Victoria and was won by Waikerie based South Australian driver Neil Hoffman.

The 2014/15 championship was held at the Kalgoorlie International Speedway in Kalgoorlie, Western Australia on 28 February and 1 March. South Australia's Anthony Beare won his 2nd national championship leading home former three time national champion Brad McClure of Victoria with another Victorian Mick Dann finishing third.

The 2015/16 championship will be held at the Redline Speedway in Ballarat, Victoria on 12–13 March 2006.

Winners since 1989/90

See also

Motorsport in Australia
List of Australian motor racing series

References

External links
Australian Street Stock Championship Honour Roll

Street Stock Championship
Street Stock Championship
Street Stock